The List of shipwrecks in 1777 includes some ships sunk, wrecked or otherwise lost during 1777.

January

2 January

6 January

15 January

31 January

Unknown Date

February

14 February

18 February

20 February

24 February

27 February

Unknown date

March

4 March

17 March

20 March

28 March

Unknown date

April

1 April

12 April

23 April

29 April

Unknown date

May

26 May

Unknown date

June

4 June

14 June

19 June

20 January

22 June

22 June

30 June

Unknown date

July

10 July

18 July

20 July

31 July

Unknown date

August

5 August

27 August

31 August

Unknown date

September

10 September

26 September

Unknown date

October

1 October

5 October

6 October

9 October

22 October

29 October

30 October

Unknown date

November

2 November

7 November

13 November

17 November

20 November

21 November

23 November

Unknown date

December

3 December

10 December

13 December

15 December

23 December

31 December

Unknown date

Unknown date

References

1777